Thomas Lennart Dennerby (born 13 August 1959 in Enskede) is a Swedish football coach who is currently head coach for India women's national football team.

Career
Dennerby, the former coach of the Nigeria women's national football team also known as super Falcons was previously a player in Hammarby IF and Spårvägens IF, as well as the national U21 team. He has also worked as a police officer. As a coach, he won Allsvenskan with Hammarby IF in 2001, and Damallsvenskan with Djurgården/Älvsjö.

Dennerby can be seen in the Sveriges Television documentary television series The Other Sport from 2013.

He became manager of the Nigerian women's national team in January 2018. He resigned in October 2019.

On 9 November 2019, All India Football Federation (AIFF) appointed Dennerby as the head coach of India U17 Women's team which is going to participate in the 2020 FIFA U-17 Women's World Cup as the host of the edition.

Later Thomas Dennerby took charge as Head Coach of the Indian Senior Women's National Team in August 2021.

Honours

Individual 
 Swedish Manager of the Year (women's football) (1): 2004
 CAF Awards - Women's Coach of the Year (nominated)

References

External links
 

1959 births
Living people
Swedish football managers
Swedish footballers
Hammarby Fotboll players
2007 FIFA Women's World Cup managers
2011 FIFA Women's World Cup managers
Hammarby Fotboll non-playing staff
Hammarby Fotboll (women) managers
Djurgårdens IF Fotboll (women) managers
Hammarby Fotboll managers
Sweden women's national football team managers
Association football midfielders
Nigeria women's national football team managers
India women's national football team managers
2019 FIFA Women's World Cup managers
Swedish expatriate football managers
Damallsvenskan managers